In computer science, M-trees are tree data structures that are similar to R-trees and B-trees. It is constructed using a metric and relies on the triangle inequality for efficient range and k-nearest neighbor (k-NN) queries.
While M-trees can perform well in many conditions, the tree can also have large overlap and there is no clear strategy on how to best avoid overlap. In addition, it can only be used for distance functions that satisfy the triangle inequality, while many advanced dissimilarity functions used in information retrieval do not satisfy this.

Overview

As in any tree-based data structure, the M-tree is composed of nodes and leaves. In each node there is a data object that identifies it uniquely and a pointer to a sub-tree where its children reside. Every leaf has several data objects. For each node there is a radius  that defines a Ball in the desired metric space.

M-tree construction

Components 
An M-tree has these components and sub-components:

 Non-leaf nodes
 A set of routing objects NRO.
 Pointer to Node's parent object Op.
 Leaf nodes
 A set of objects NO.
 Pointer to Node's parent object Op.
 Routing Object 
 (Feature value of) routing object Or.
 Covering radius r(Or).
 Pointer to covering tree T(Or).
 Distance of Or from its parent object d(Or,P(Or))
 Object
 (Feature value of the) object Oj.
 Object identifier oid(Oj).
 Distance of Oj from its parent object d(Oj,P(Oj))

Insert 
The main idea is first to find a leaf node  where the new object  belongs. If  is full then invoke a method to split . The algorithm is as follows:

   Input: Node  of M-Tree , 
   Output: A new instance of  containing all entries in original 

   's routing objects or objects
   if  is not a leaf then
   {
        /* Look for entries that the new object fits into */
         
        
        {
           /* If there are one or more entry, then look for an entry such that is closer to the new object */
           
        }
        else
        {
           /* If there are no such entry, then look for an object with minimal distance from */ 
           /* its covering radius's edge to the new object */
           
           /* Upgrade the new radii of the entry */
           
        }
        /* Continue inserting in the next level */
        
   else
   {
        /* If the node has capacity then just insert the new object */
        if  is not full then
        {  }
        /* The node is at full capacity, then it is needed to do a new split in this level */
        else
        {  }
   }

Split 
The split must be repeated if  has not enough capacity to store . The algorithm is as follow:

   Input: Node  of M-Tree , 
   Output: A new instance of  containing a new partition.

   /* The new routing objects are now all those in the node plus the new routing object */
   let be  entries of 
   if  is not the root then
   {
      /*Get the parent node and the parent routing object*/
      
      
   }
   /* This node will contain part of the objects of the node to be split */
   Create a new node 
   /* Promote two routing objects from the node to be split, to be new routing objects */
   Create new objects 
   Promote()
   /* Choose which objects from the node being split will act as new routing objects */
   Partition()
   /* Store entries in each new routing object */
   
   if  is the current root then
   {
       /* Create a new node and set it as new root and store the new routing objects */
       
       
   }
   else
   {
       /* Now use the parent routing object to store one of the new objects */
       
       
       {
           /* The second routing object is stored in the parent only if it has free capacity */
           
       }
       else
       {
            /*If there is no free capacity then split the level up*/
            
       }
   }

M-tree queries

Range query 
A range query is where a minimum similarity/maximum distance value is specified. 
For a given query object  and a maximum search distance
, the range query range(Q, r(Q)) selects all the indexed objects  such that .

Algorithm RangeSearch starts from the root node and recursively traverses all the paths which cannot be excluded from leading to qualifying objects.

 Input: Node  of M-Tree MT,  : query object, : search radius

 Output: all the DB objects 

 { 
   
 
   if  is not a leaf then { 
      do {
            then { 
             
              then
                
           }
     }
   }
   else { 
      do {
            then { 
             
              then
               
           }
     }
   }
 }

  is the identifier of the object which resides on a separate data file.
  is a sub-tree – the covering tree of

k-NN queries 
k-nearest neighbor (k-NN) query takes the cardinality of the input set as an input parameter. For a given query object Q ∈ D and an
integer k ≥ 1, the k-NN query NN(Q, k) selects the k indexed objects which have the shortest distance from Q, according to the distance function d.

See also

 Segment tree
 Interval tree - A degenerate R-tree for one dimension (usually time)
 Bounding volume hierarchy
 Spatial index
 GiST

References

Trees (data structures)
Database index techniques
Geometric data structures